The Revue du Nord is a peer-reviewed academic journal of history and archaeology published by the joint universities of Northern France. The journal concentrates on northern France, Belgium, and the Netherlands. It was established in 1910 and the editor-in-chief is Philippe Guignet (Charles de Gaulle University – Lille III).

Abstracting and indexing 
The journal is abstracted and indexed in:
 Scopus
 FRANCIS
 PASCAL
 Historical Abstracts

References

External links 
 
 
 

1910 establishments in France
French-language journals
Archaeology journals
European history journals
Publications established in 1910